Frischmuth is a German surname. Notable people with the surname include:

Barbara Frischmuth
Edith Hauer-Frischmuth
Gert Frischmuth
Johann Frischmuth

See also
Frishmuth

German-language surnames